The Indian cricket team toured Sri Lanka from 12 July to 14 August 1993. The tour began with a first-class fixture against Sri Lanka Board President's XI and ended with the final ODI game. In all, it consisted of one first-class game, and three Test and One Day Internationals (ODIs) each.

India beat Sri Lanka 1–0 in the Test series and lost 2–1 in the ODI series. Sri Lanka's Aravinda de Silva scored a total of 266 runs in the Test series and was named the Player of the Series alongside India's Manoj Prabhakar. India's Anil Kumble picked up 13 wickets and was the highest wicket-taker in the series. In the ODI series, India's Mohammad Azharuddin top-scored with 200 runs, and Prabhakar and Sri Lanka's Pramodya Wickramasinghe with seven wickets each were the highest wicket-takers.

Tour match

Three-day match: Sri Lanka Board President's XI vs Indians

Test Series

1st Test

2nd Test

3rd Test

One Day Internationals (ODIs)

Sri Lanka won the series 2-1.

1st ODI

2nd ODI

3rd ODI

References

External links
 Series page on ESPNcricinfo
 Series page on CricketArchive

1993 in Indian cricket
1993 in Sri Lankan cricket
1993
International cricket competitions from 1991–92 to 1994
Sri Lankan cricket seasons from 1972–73 to 1999–2000